The 1911 Victorian Football Association season was the 35th season of the Australian rules football competition. The premiership was won by the Essendon (Association) Football Club, after it defeated Brunswick by eight points in a rain-affected Grand Final on 23 September. It was the first premiership won by the club, and it came after having finished second on the ladder in three consecutive seasons without playing in the final match.

Premiership 
The home-and-home season was played over eighteen rounds, with each club playing the others twice; then, the top four clubs contested a finals series under the amended Argus system to determine the premiers for the season.

Ladder

Finals

Notable events 
North Melbourne was leading 7.5 (47) to 2.1 (13) at the time, and its score was reset to zero. Nevertheless, North Melbourne still went on to win the game 10.9 (69) to 7.6 (48).
 In the first final between Essendon and Brunswick on 16 September, Dave McNamara (Essendon) had a place kick after the final bell from 40 yards out directly in front, which would have won the match and the premiership if successful. Spectators streamed onto the ground before he took his kick, but he kicked before waiting for a space to be cleared and missed the goal by six feet, resulting in a two-point win for Brunswick and forcing a Grand Final the following week. Essendon protested the result on the basis of interference from the crowd, and McNamara stated that the encroachment of the crowd prevented him from taking as long a run-up as he had desired; but, he was deemed to have voluntarily taken his kick without waiting for more space to be cleared (as he was entitled to do), and he was not interfered with after starting his run-up, so the protest was dismissed.
 Brunswick captain Jack McKenzie was approached to throw the Grand Final in Essendon's favour. He was offered £150 if he, Chase and Johnson all "played stiff" during the game. McKenzie refused the offer and reported it to the Association, and the Grand Final is not believed to have ultimately been compromised by any form of bribery. This was the second match-fixing scandal in Melbourne football in two years, with two players from League club  banned for match fixing in 1910.
 Dave McNamara (Essendon) was the Association's leading goalkicker for the season. Including finals, he set a new Association record of 81 goals, breaking the record of 76 goals set by Frank Caine in 1910.

External links 
 Victorian Football Association/Victorian Football League history (1877–2008)
 List of VFA premiers

References 

Victorian Football League seasons
VFL